Euprophantis is a genus of moths in the family Gracillariidae.

Species
Euprophantis autoglypta Meyrick, 1921

External links
Global Taxonomic Database of Gracillariidae (Lepidoptera) 

Gracillariinae
Gracillarioidea genera